Harvey Oberfeld (born March 4, 1945) is a Canadian journalist. Now retired, he maintains a personal blog featuring personal anecdotes and opinion pieces about current events.

Life and career
Born in Montreal, Quebec, he graduated in 1968 with a Bachelor of Arts degree from Sir George Williams University (now Concordia University) in Montreal. While attending university he was a reporter for The Georgian campus newspaper. His stories on the possible cancellation of the scheduled Youth Pavilion at Expo 67 for lack of adequate capital/operational funding led to wider media coverage and substantial new corporate contributions that saved the Pavilion; Oberfeld was appointed to the Youth Advisory Committee for Expo 67.

Print 
After graduating, Oberfeld took his first daily newspaper job at the Saskatoon Star Phoenix, covering, among other stories, the early court appearances of David Milgaard who was wrongfully convicted for the 1969 murder of Saskatoon nursing student Gail Miller.
 
After moving to the Regina Leader-Post for two years, Oberfeld joined The Vancouver Sun in 1971, initially covering the Burnaby and then Vancouver city halls, and then becoming Sun'''s first regional affairs reporter, inaugurating full-time coverage of the Greater Vancouver Regional District as it assumed a larger role in regional services.  
 
Oberfeld was promoted to the Sun's Victoria Bureau in 1974, covering the BC Legislature under the NDP government of  Premier Dave Barrett and then the Social Credit government of Premier Bill Bennett.

 Television 
In 1979, Oberfeld joined BCTV's Legislative Bureau, making the switch to television during the station's "Golden Era" under News Director Cameron Bell and Assignment Editor Keith Bradbury. Their strategy of hiring accomplished newspaper reporters to bolster the flagship News Hour news program helped propel BCTV to the top of the ratings, a position it still holds under its new owners CanWest Global. Oberfeld was a key reporter in the station's coverage of British Columbia's "Dirty Tricks Scandal", which eventually saw eight B.C. government employees lose their jobs amidst allegations of election-boundary interference, phoney letters-to-the-editor and secret election-fund bank accounts.
 
In 1981, BCTV moved Oberfeld to Ottawa where he became the station's first full-time bureau chief during Prime Minister Pierre Elliott Trudeau's final term in office. He also covered Parliament Hill under Prime Ministers John Turner and Brian Mulroney. Oberfeld returned to Vancouver in 1989 where he did political and investigative reporting for BCTV / Global until he retired in 2006.

Oberfeld currently writes a blog called Keeping it real ...''.

Awards 

During his career, Oberfeld won several regional and national journalism awards including:

 Canadian Association of Journalists' Award (1990) for Outstanding Investigative Reporting in Canada by a Regional Television station
 Webster Award for Best Reporting of the Year (1991-Television)
 Webster Award for Excellence In Legal Journalism (2004)
 Canadian Association of Broadcasters Gold Ribbon Award (1991) for a News Series
 Radio-Television News Directors Association of Canada Dan MacArthur Awards (1991- Regional and National)
 BC Association of Broadcasters Award (1996) for Best Reporting-Television

References 

 http://www.harveyoberfeld.ca
 Canadian Association of Journalists
 Webster Awards, 1991
 Webster Awards, 2004
 Canadian Association of Broadcasters Gold Ribbon Awards
 Radio-Television News Directors Association of Canada Dan MacArthur Awards
 BC Association of Broadcasters Excellence Award

Anglophone Quebec people
Canadian newspaper reporters and correspondents
Canadian television reporters and correspondents
Journalists from Montreal
1945 births
Living people
Sir George Williams University alumni